Leader of the Opposition (officially the Leader of His Majesty's Opposition) is usually the leader of the largest political party in the House of Representatives of Grenada that is not in government. The Leader of the Opposition is appointed by Governor-General of Grenada.

Leaders of the Opposition

References

See also
Politics of Grenada
Governor-General of Grenada
Prime Minister of Grenada

Politics of Grenada
Members of the Parliament of Grenada
Grenada